Anolis krugi, the olive bush anole, Krug's anole, or orange dewlap anole, is a species of lizard in the family Dactyloidae. The species is found in Puerto Rico.

References

Anoles
Endemic fauna of Puerto Rico
Reptiles of Puerto Rico
Reptiles described in 1877
Taxa named by Wilhelm Peters